Merdigera obscura is a species of air-breathing land snail, a terrestrial pulmonate gastropod mollusk in the family Enidae.

Distribution and habitat
This species is present in north-western Africa and in most of Europe from Portugal to Russia. They can be found mainly at tree trunks, under leaf litter or stones and on walls. They can be found mainly at tree trunks, under leaf litter or stones and on walls.

Description

Merdigera obscura can reach a shell length of about 8.5-10.5 x 3-4 mm. These shells have 6 slightly convex whorls with deep suture. The apertural margin is reflected and white, not connected by a callus or white layer at the parietal side. The shell colour is evenly brown. The surface has dense radially striations.

The animal is dark brown, lighter laterally and on the foot. The upper tentacles are long, the lower tentacles length is 1/4 of upper tentacles. The animal crawls with the shell in a very high position and not much bent to the right side. Juveniles and adults often have camouflage. This species is rather similar to Ena montana.

Biology
Females lay 12-20 oval eggs between May and October. Juveniles hatch after 2 weeks. Adults can be found in the first months of the second year.

See also
 List of non-marine molluscs of the Czech Republic
 List of non-marine molluscs of Ukraine
 List of non-marine molluscs of Great Britain
 List of non-marine molluscs of Ireland

Bibliography
Anderson, R. 2005. An Annotated List of the Non-Marine Mollusca of Britain and Ireland. InvertebrateIreland Online, Ulster Museum , Belfast and National Museum of Ireland , Dublin
Kerney, M, 1999, Atlas of the Land and Freshwater Molluscs of Britain and Ireland, Harley Books,

References

Enidae
Gastropods described in 1774
Taxa named by Otto Friedrich Müller